The 2012 World Indoor Bowls Championship  was held at Potters Leisure Resort, Hopton on Sea, Great Yarmouth, England, in January 2012.

Winners

Draw and results

Men's singles

Finals

Top half

Bottom half

Women's singles

Open Pairs

Mixed Pairs

References

External links
Official website

2012 in bowls
World Indoor Bowls Championship